Kobe Goossens (born 29 April 1996) is a Belgian cyclist, who currently rides for UCI WorldTeam . In October 2020, he was named in the startlist for the 2020 Vuelta a España.

Major results

Road

2018
 2nd Overall Tour du Jura
1st  Young rider classification
 3rd De Vlaamse Pijl
 6th Circuit de Wallonie
 8th Overall Ronde de l'Isard
 9th Eschborn–Frankfurt Under–23
2019
 1st  Overall Tour du Jura
1st Stage 1
 3rd Overall Circuit des Ardennes
 5th Internationale Wielertrofee Jong Maar Moedig
 7th Overall Tour du Loir-et-Cher
2021
 1st  Mountains classification, Tour de Romandie
2022
 5th Trofeo Serra de Tramuntana
 7th Trofeo Calvià
 9th Trofeo Pollença–Port d'Andratx
2023
 1st Trofeo Andratx–Mirador D'es Colomer
 1st Trofeo Serra de Tramuntana
 7th Trofeo Calvia
 10th Figueira Champions Classic

Grand Tour general classification results timeline

Cyclo-cross

2013–2014
 3rd Overall UCI Junior World Cup
1st Koksijde
2nd Rome
 1st Junior Kalmthout
 Junior Superprestige
3rd Hamme
3rd Diegem
3rd Middelkerke
 Junior BPost Bank Trophy
3rd Ronse

References

External links

1996 births
Living people
Belgian male cyclists
Sportspeople from Leuven
Cyclists from Flemish Brabant
21st-century Belgian people